Bijaya Kumar Nayak (4 August 1951 – 26 February 2020) was an Indian lawyer and politician from Odisha belonging to Indian National Congress. He was a legislator of the Odisha Legislative Assembly.

Biography
Nayak was born on 4 August 1951. He was elected as a member of the Odisha Legislative Assembly from Ersama in 1995.

Nayak died on 26 February 2020 at the age of 68.

References

1951 births
2020 deaths
Odisha MLAs 1995–2000
Indian National Congress politicians from Odisha
People from Jagatsinghpur district
Indian lawyers